Mubarak bin Mohammed Al Nahyan (1935–2010) was an Emirati royal and the first interior minister of the United Arab Emirates. He also held other public posts which were mostly security-related.

Early life
Al Nahyan was born in 1935. He was the second son of Mohammed bin Khalifa Al Nahyan and grandson of Khalifa bin Zayed Al Nahyan. Mubarak's elder brother was Hamdan. He also had younger brothers, Tahnoun and Saif.

Career
Mubarak was close to the rulers of Abu Dhabi. During the reign of Shakhbut bin Sultan, he was named as the director of the police and the public security department in 1961. He replaced Sultan bin Shakbut Al Nahyan as the director of the Abu Dhabi Police. In May 1964 Sheikh Shakhbut removed Bill Edge, a British citizen, from office who had been serving as the commander (it was labelled as commandant) and chairman of the Abu Dhabi Police since 1961 and appointed Mubarak Al Nahyan to this post. 

When Zayed bin Sultan succeeded Shakhbut bin Sultan as the ruler of Abu Dhabi in 1966, Mubarak and his brothers, Hamdan, Tahnoun and Saif, assumed major roles due to the fact that Zayed bin Sultan's sons were very young to hold these posts. Mubarak Al Nahyan retained his post as commander of the Abu Dhabi Police under Sheikh Zayed. In 1967 Mubarak Al Nahyan was promoted from the rank of colonel to that of major general. He became the minister of interior of Abu Dhabi in June 1971. 

Immediately after the establishment of the United Arab Emirates on 2 December 1971 Mubarak was appointed minister of interior on 9 December, being the first Emirati official to hold this post. He was made a member of the Abu Dhabi's executive council in December 1973. His term as the commander of the Abu Dhabi Police ended in 1974, and he was replaced by Mohammed Jumaa Al Dhaheri in the post. He continued to serve as the interior minister of the United Arab Emirates until 1990.

Personal life and death
His eldest son was Nahyan bin Mubarak Al Nahyan, an Emirati politician. His other son, Hamdan, served as the chairman of Abu Dhabi’s Civil Aviation Department and chairman of Gulf Air. 

Mubarak Al Nahyan was seriously injured in a road accident in the United Kingdom in 1979. He died on 24 February 2010.

Awards and legacy
Mubarak Al Nahyan was the recipient of the Zayed 2nd Order, the Order of King Abdulaziz and the Qatar Collar of Merit. In 2022 a prize was instituted in memory of him, Sheikh Mubarak bin Mohammed Prize for Natural History.

References

1935 births
2010 deaths
Mubarak
Interior ministers of the United Arab Emirates
20th-century Emirati people